Route 248 is a highway in southwest Missouri.  Its eastern terminus is at U.S. Route 65 in Branson.  Its western terminus is at Route 76/Route 86/Route 112 in Cassville.

Route description
Route 248 begins at a diverging diamond interchange with U.S. Route 65 at the northern terminus of Business US 65.  The highway proceeds west through northern Branson as the Shepherd of the Hills Expressway, which despite its name is a four-lane boulevard with no controlled-access interchanges.  It eventually turns north as a two-lane highway and leaves Branson (Shepherd of the Hills Expressway continues westward as a separate highway from an intersection near Kirby Van Burch's theater).  North of Branson, it intersects Route 76 (the Ozark Mountain Highroad).  Seven miles north of Branson, it begins a five-mile (8 km) concurrency with U.S. Route 160.  At Reeds Spring Junction, the road leaves US 160 and begins a short concurrency  (about one mile) with Route 13.

Route 248 continues west to Reeds Spring, where it joins Routes 265 and 413.  The three roads will be united to Galena.  This section of highway is a windy, hilly, two-lane highway making switchbacks through the Ozark Mountains.  The entire section of highway is marked with no-passing stripes.  At Galena is the Y-Bridge, placed on the National Register of Historic Places (closed to vehicles).  Just north of the bridge is the western terminus of Route 176.  Route 248/265/413 turns west, crossing James River.  Route 248 then leaves the concurrency, heading into downtown Galena.  The highway then leaves Galena on a northwesterly direction.

At Crossroads (five miles west of Galena) is an intersection with Route 173.  Twelve miles west of Crossroads, Route 248 intersects Route 39 one mile (1.6 km) south of Jenkins.  The highway becomes fairly straight, though still hilly as it heads into Cassville.  Route 248 ends in downtown Cassville at the concurrency of Routes 76, 86, and 112.

History
Route 248 was initially Route 148, numbered in the mid-1950s to replace Route 80 between Elsey and Branson when the rest became US 160. A late 1950s extension of Route 76 replaced all of Route 148 except the portion north of Cape Fair, which became Route 173; Route 148 was then reassigned to the nearby former Route 44 from Cassville to Galena and part of Route 76 east from Reeds Spring. It has since been extended back east to Branson along former US 65.

Major intersections

References

248
Transportation in Barry County, Missouri
Transportation in Stone County, Missouri
Transportation in Taney County, Missouri